Kyabé Airport  is a public use airport located near Kyabé, Moyen-Chari, Chad.

See also
List of airports in Chad

References

External links 
 Airport record for Kyabé Airport at Landings.com

Airports in Chad
Moyen-Chari Region